Herta Frey-Dexler (16 January 1917 – 10 January 1999) was a Swiss figure skater. She competed in the ladies' singles event at the 1936 Winter Olympics.

References

External links
 

1917 births
1999 deaths
Swiss female single skaters
Olympic figure skaters of Switzerland
Figure skaters at the 1936 Winter Olympics
Figure skaters from Vienna